Rick Hawn (born September 15, 1976) is a former Olympic judoka and professional mixed martial artist. A professional MMA fighter from 2009 - 2015, Hawn most notably competed for Bellator MMA, where he won the Bellator Season 6 Lightweight Tournament and the Bellator Season 9 Welterweight Tournament.

Background
Hawn was born in Chicago, but when he was young, his family moved to Eugene, Oregon.  At age 12, Hawn began training judo when his father got back into the sport.  Hawn continued to compete while attending South Eugene High School, where he also competed in wrestling, and also football in his senior year.

Olympic career
In 1996, after graduating from high school, Hawn qualified to live at the Olympic Training Center in Colorado Springs, Colorado.  There he trained judo for eight years and ultimately qualified for the 2004 Olympic Games.  At the Games in 2004, Hawn went 2-2 and finished in 9th place. Hawn also won numerous medals at U.S. national championships and two medals at the Pan American Games.

After the 2004 games, Hawn moved to Boston to train with bronze medalist Jimmy Pedro. However, Hawn failed to make the 2008 Olympic judo team.  Soon after, Hawn began training for a career in Mixed Martial Arts.

Mixed martial arts career

Early career
Hawn's professional mixed martial arts debut came in January 2009 in Worcester, Massachusetts.  Hawn won by technical knockout in the first round. Over the next two years, Hawn won his next eight fights, six by TKO.

Bellator MMA
In March 2011, Hawn began competing in the Bellator MMA's Season Four Welterweight Tournament.  He defeated Jim Wallhead by unanimous decision in the quarterfinals and Lyman Good by split decision in the semifinals.

Hawn was defeated by Jay Hieron at Bellator 43 in a fight which some believe was a controversial split decision.

After a strong showing in the Season Four Tournament, Hawn was planning to return to the cage as part of Bellator's Season Five Welterweight Tournament, but an injury during training forced him out of the tournament.

Hawn returned to the promotion in the spring of 2012 as a participant in the Season Six Lightweight Tournament; dropping down to Lightweight for the first time in his MMA career. He faced Ricardo Tirloni in the opening round at Bellator 62. Tirloni was able to land with a few leg kicks, but Hawn was able to continue pressing forward. Hawn then landed a right hand which dropped Tirloni. Hawn hit Tirloni with punches and hammerfists on the ground and the fight was stopped at 2:36 of the opening round.

He next faced Lloyd Woodard in the semifinals at Bellator 66 on April 20, 2012. Hawn won the fight via KO in the second round. Hawn next took on Brent Weedman in the tournament finals on May 25, 2012 at Bellator 70 in New Orleans, Louisiana. He won the fight via unanimous decision.

At Bellator 95, Hawn faced Karo Parisyan whom Hawn had twice defeated in judo competition. During the bout, Hawn was able to land a right cross knocking Parisyan to his knees and landed repeated hammerfists on Parisyan prompting the fight to be stopped 1:55 into the second round.

In the fall of 2013, Hawn entered his second Bellator Welterweight Tournament. He defeated both Herman Terrado and Brent Weedman by unanimous decision in the quarterfinals and semifinals, respectively.

In the finals Hawn faced Ron Keslar at Bellator 109 and won via knockout in the third round.

Hawn faced Douglas Lima for the vacant Bellator Welterweight Championship at Bellator 117 on April 18, 2014. He lost the fight via TKO in the second round when his corner stopped the fight due to the amount of leg kicks he was taking.

Hawn faced returning Dave Jansen on October 24, 2014 at Bellator 130. He lost the fight via unanimous decision.

In November 2014, Hawn announced on Twitter that he was released from the organization.

Titan Fighting Championship
Hawn has signed with Titan Fighting Championship. He made his promotional debut in a lightweight match at Titan FC 32 on December 19, 2014 against Carlo Prater. Hawn won the fight by unanimous decision.

Hawn defeated Pat Healy by split decision for the vacant Titan FC Lightweight Championship at Titan FC 35 on September 19, 2015. Healy was stripped of the title for missing weight the day prior.

Retirement
Hawn officially retired from MMA on October 19, 2015, as reigning Titan FC Lightweight Champion.

Hawn came out of retirement to face Gesias Cavalcante on October 21, 2022 at Combat FC 2. He lost the bout via guillotine choke in the second round.

Championships and accomplishments

Mixed martial arts
Bellator Fighting Championships
Bellator Season Four Welterweight Tournament Runner-Up
Bellator Season Six Lightweight Tournament Championship 
Bellator Season Nine Welterweight Tournament Championship 
Titan Fighting Championship
Titan FC Lightweight Championship (One time)
Triumph Fighter
Triumph Fighter Welterweight Champion (One time)

Mixed martial arts record

|-
|Loss
|align=center|21–5
|Gesias Cavalcante
|Submission (guillotine choke)
|Combat FC 2
|
|align=center|2
|align=center|3:41
|Wilmington, Massachusetts, United States
|
|-
|Win
|align=center|21–4
|Pat Healy
|Decision (split)
| Titan FC 35
|
|align=center|5
|align=center|5:00
|Ridgefield, Washington, United States
|
|-
|Win
|align=center|20–4
|Derek Loffer
|Decision (unanimous)
|CES 28
|
|align=center|3
|align=center|5:00
|Lincoln, Rhode Island, United States
|
|-
|Win
|align=center|19–4
|Carlo Prater
|Decision (unanimous)
| Titan FC 32
|
|align=center|3
|align=center|5:00
|Lowell, Massachusetts, United States
|
|-
|Loss
|align=center|18–4
|Dave Jansen
|Decision (unanimous)
|Bellator 130
|
|align=center|3
|align=center|5:00
|Mulvane, Kansas, United States
|
|-
|Loss
|align=center|18–3
|Douglas Lima
|TKO (corner stoppage)
|Bellator 117
|
|align=center|2
|align=center|3:19
|Council Bluffs, Iowa, United States
|
|-
| Win
|align=center|18–2
| Ron Keslar
| KO (punch)
|Bellator 109
|
|align=center|3
|align=center|0:55
|Bethlehem, Pennsylvania, United States
|
|-
|Win
|align=center| 17–2
|Brent Weedman
|Decision (unanimous)
|Bellator 104
|
|align=center|3
|align=center|5:00
|Cedar Rapids, Iowa, United States
|
|-
|Win
|align=center| 16–2
|Herman Terrado
|Decision (unanimous)
|Bellator 100
|
|align=center|3
|align=center|5:00
|Phoenix, Arizona, United States
|Bellator Season Nine Welterweight Tournament Quarterfinal.
|-
|Win
|align=center| 15–2
|Karo Parisyan
|KO (punches)
|Bellator 95
|
|align=center|2
|align=center|1:55
|Atlantic City, New Jersey, United States
|Welterweight bout.
|-
|Loss
|align=center| 14–2
|Michael Chandler
|Submission (rear-naked choke)
|Bellator 85
|
|align=center|2
|align=center|3:07
|Irvine, California, United States
|For the Bellator Lightweight Championship.
|-
|Win
|align=center| 14–1
|Brent Weedman
|Decision (unanimous)
|Bellator 70
|
|align=center|3
|align=center|5:00
|New Orleans, Louisiana, United States
|Bellator Season Six Lightweight Tournament Final.
|-
|Win
|align=center| 13–1
|Lloyd Woodard
|KO (punch)
|Bellator 66
|
|align=center|2
|align=center|0:10
|Cleveland, Ohio, United States
|Bellator Season Six Lightweight Tournament Semifinal.
|-
|Win
|align=center| 12–1
|Ricardo Tirloni
|KO (punches)
|Bellator 62
|
|align=center|1
|align=center|2:36
|Laredo, Texas, United States
|Bellator Season Six Lightweight Tournament Quarterfinal.
|-
|Loss
|align=center| 11–1
|Jay Hieron
|Decision (split)
|Bellator 43
|
|align=center| 3
|align=center| 5:00
|Newkirk, United States
|Bellator Season Four Welterweight Tournament Final.
|-
|Win
|align=center| 11–0
|Lyman Good
|Decision (split)
|Bellator 39
|
|align=center| 3
|align=center| 5:00
|Uncasville, United States
|Bellator Season Four Welterweight Tournament Semifinal.
|-
|Win
|align=center| 10–0
|Jim Wallhead
|Decision (unanimous)
|Bellator 35
|
|align=center| 3
|align=center| 5:00
|Lemoore, United States
|Bellator Season Four Welterweight Tournament Quarterfinal.
|-
|Win
|align=center| 9–0
|LeVon Maynard
|KO (punches)
|Bellator 33
|
|align=center| 1
|align=center| 4:53
|Philadelphia, United States
|Bellator Season Four Welterweight Tournament Qualifier.
|-
|Win
|align=center| 8–0
|Shonie Carter
|TKO (head kick & punches)
|Triumph Fighter 3: Havoc
|
|align=center| 2
|align=center| 4:08
|Milford, New Hampshire, United States
|
|-
|Win
|align=center| 7–0
|Dennis Olson
|TKO (punches)
|Triumph Fighter 2: Inferno
|
|align=center| 2
|align=center| 2:02
|Milford, New Hampshire, United States
| 
|-
|Win
|align=center| 6–0
|Tom Gallicchio
|Decision (unanimous)
|World Championship Fighting 9
|
|align=center| 3
|align=center| 5:00
|Wilmington, Massachusetts, United States
| 
|-
|Win
|align=center| 5–0
|Brendan Weafer
|Decision (unanimous)
|CFX 5: Mayhem in Mansfield
|
|align=center| 3
|align=center| 5:00
|Mansfield, Massachusetts, United States
| 
|-
|Win
|align=center| 4–0
|Bruce Boyington
|TKO (punches)
|CFX 3: Rumble in the Jungle
|
|align=center| 1
|align=center| 3:03
|Plymouth, Massachusetts, United States
| 
|-
|Win
|align=center| 3–0
|Daniel Ford
|TKO (punches)
|CFX 2: Thunder in the Dome
|
|align=center| 1
|align=center| 1:49
|Milford, New Hampshire, United States
| 
|-
|Win
|align=center| 2–0
|Billy Flynn
|KO (punches)
|World Championship Fighting 6
|
|align=center| 1
|align=center| 1:12
|Wilmington, Massachusetts, United States
| 
|-
|Win
|align=center| 1–0
|Bruno Decosta
|TKO (punches)
|CFX 1: Wartown Beatdown
|
|align=center| 1
|align=center| 2:01
|Worcester, Massachusetts, United States
|

References

External links
 

American male mixed martial artists
Mixed martial artists from Oregon
Welterweight mixed martial artists
Mixed martial artists utilizing judo
Mixed martial artists utilizing Brazilian jiu-jitsu
American male judoka
Olympic judoka of the United States
American practitioners of Brazilian jiu-jitsu
People awarded a black belt in Brazilian jiu-jitsu
1976 births
Living people
Sportspeople from Eugene, Oregon
Pan American Games medalists in judo
Judoka at the 2004 Summer Olympics
Pan American Games bronze medalists for the United States
Judoka at the 2007 Pan American Games
Medalists at the 2007 Pan American Games